Poland competed at the 2015 European Games, in Baku, Azerbaijan from 12 to 28 June 2015.

Medalists

Archery

Men's

Women's

Mixed

Badminton

Based on the BWF European rankings as at 26 March 2015, Poland has secured the following quotas for the Games.

Boxing

Men

Women

(all the men's medalists will qualify to participate in the World Championships 2015)

Canoe sprint

Men

Women

Qualification Legend: FA = Qualify to final (medal); FB = Qualify to final B (non-medal)

Cycling

Mountain biking

Road

Men's

Men's

Diving

Men

Women

Fencing

 Men's individual épée – Radosław Zawrotniak
 Men's team foil – Leszek Rajski, Paweł Kawiecki, Michał Janda, Jakub Surwiłło
 Men's individual foil – Leszek Rajski, Paweł Kawiecki, Michał Janda, Jakub Surwiłło
 Men's individual sabre – Adam Skrodzki
 Women's individual épée – Ewa Nelip
 Women's team foil – Anna Szymczak, Julia Walczyk, Julia Chrzanowska, Natalia Gołębiowska
 Women's individual foil – Anna Szymczak, Julia Walczyk, Julia Chrzanowska, Natalia Gołębiowska
 Women's team sabre – Magdalena Pasternak, Angelika Wątor, Martyna Wątora, Karolina Kaleta
 Women's individual sabre – Magdalena Pasternak, Angelika Wątor, Martyna Wątora, Karolina Kaleta

Gymnastics

Acrobatic

Team

Artistic

Men

Women

Individual finals

Trampoline

Judo

 Men's 60 kg – Łukasz Kiełbasiński
 Men's 66 kg – Aleksander Beta
 Men's 73 kg – Damian Szwarnowiecki
 Men's 81 kg – Łukasz Błach, Jakub Kubieniec
 Men's 90 kg – Patryk Ciechomski
 Men's 100 kg – Jakub Wójcik
 Men's +100 kg – Maciej Sarnacki
 Women's 48 kg – Ewa Konieczny
 Women's 52 kg – Agata Perenc
 Women's 57 kg – Arleta Podolak
 Women's 63 kg – Agata Ozdoba
 Women's 70 kg – Katarzyna Kłys
 Women's 78 kg – Daria Pogorzelec
 Women's +78 kg – Katarzyna Furmanek

Karate

Elimination round

Group A

Sambo

Shooting

Men's

Women's

Swimming

Men's:

Women

Mixed

Synchronized swimming

Table tennis

Taekwondo

Men's

Women's

Triathlon

Volleyball

Beach

Indoor
Men
Dawid Konarski, Grzegorz Kosok, Paweł Woicki, Damian Wojtaszek, Wojciech Ferens, Jan Nowakowski, Michał Kędzierski, Bartłomiej Bołądź, Artur Szalpuk, Adam Kowalski, Adrian Buchowski, Bartłomiej Grzechnik, Dawid Dryja, Aleksander Śliwka, Coach:Andrzej Kowal

Pool A

|}

|}

Quarterfinals

|}

Semifinals

|}

Third place

|}

Women
Katarzyna Skowrońska-Dolata, Agnieszka Bednarek-Kasza, Izabela Bełcik, Sylwia Pycia, Anna Werblińska, Joanna Wołosz, Katarzyna Zaroślińska, Maja Tokarska, Anna Miros, Agnieszka Kąkolewska, Agata Sawicka,  Agata Dujarczyk, Natalia Kurnikowska, Daria Paszek, Coach:Jacek Nawrocki

Pool A

|}

|}

Quarterfinals

|}

Semifinals

|}

Gold medal final

|}

Wrestling

Men's freestyle

Men's Greco-Roman

Women's Freestyle

References

Nations at the 2015 European Games
European Games
2015